Kheya (English: 'Ferrying Across') is a Bengali-language book of poems written by Rabindranath Tagore. It was published in 1906.  It deals with humanity's sorrows, aspirations and spirituality. It consists of 55 poems.

Dedication 
Tagore dedicated the book to the Indian scientist Jagdish Chandra Bose.

References

External links 
 rabindra-rachanabali.nltr.org

1906 poetry books
Poetry_collections_by_Rabindranath_Tagore
Bengali poetry collections
Bengali-language literature